Sabahattin Burcu (born 27 May 1951) is a Turkish boxer. He competed in the men's light welterweight event at the 1976 Summer Olympics.

References

1951 births
Living people
Turkish male boxers
Olympic boxers of Turkey
Boxers at the 1976 Summer Olympics
Place of birth missing (living people)
Light-welterweight boxers